Ou opera, originally known as Wenzhou luantan or Yongjia luantan, is a regional form of Chinese opera from Yongjia County, Wenzhou in southeastern Zhejiang province. In addition to Wenzhou and parts of neighboring Lishui and Taizhou (all in Zhejiang), it is also influential in parts of northern Fujian and northeastern Jiangxi.

In 2008, it was included in the national intangible cultural heritage list.

History
Wenzhou was the birthplace of nanxi, a Chinese opera form of the 12th century. The earliest form of Ou opera, however, emerged only after the end of the Ming dynasty in the 17th century, when the singing styles of gaoqiang (高腔) and kunqiang gained popularity in southern Zhejiang. The luantan style arrived later and was co-opted by locals in their performances along with gaoqiang and kunqiang. In the beginning, performances took place on temple stages only during special occasions such as the one-month Nuo religious festival, temple fairs, dragon boat racing in Ou River, weddings, harvests, or other celebrations. As demand increased throughout the region, several farmer-performers in Yongjia County became full-time performers. In the mid-Qing dynasty, they also performed Hui opera, tanhuang (灘簧, a precursor of Xi opera), and shidiao (時調). Because luantan proved the most popular vocal style, it dominated the form which gradually became known as Yongjia luantan or Wenzhou luantan.

References

Chinese opera
Culture in Wenzhou